Mladen Knežević (born 6 January 1979, Kragujevac, Serbia) is a Serbian theater, film and television actor. 

On 26 March 2021 he was appointed the director of the Princely Serbian Theatre.

References

External links 

Actors from Kragujevac
Serbian male film actors
1979 births
Living people